The following highways are numbered 662:

Canada

United States